The Gustavus Holmes House is a historic residence in Astoria, Oregon, United States.

It was listed on the National Register of Historic Places in 1984.

See also
 National Register of Historic Places listings in Clatsop County, Oregon

References

External links

1892 establishments in Oregon
Houses completed in 1892
Houses on the National Register of Historic Places in Astoria, Oregon
Queen Anne architecture in Oregon
Stick-Eastlake architecture in Oregon